Hermann Heiss (29 December 1897 – 6 December 1966) was a German composer, pianist, and educator. His work was part of the music event in the art competition at the 1932 Summer Olympics.

Life
Heiss was born in Darmstadt and studied composition first in Frankfurt with Sekles in 1921, and then in Vienna with Josef Matthias Hauer from 1924 to 1926. After leaving Hauer's tutelage he returned to his native city to study the piano and compose. In 1928 he relocated to the island of Spiekeroog in the North Sea, where he taught music at the Herman-Lietz School until 1933. He then moved to Berlin where he unsuccessfully sought performances of his works. During the war he composed music for the Luftwaffe and for other military groups . He was also self-taught. Hauer dedicated his book Twelve-Tone Technique (1925) to Heiss, who later claimed to have collaborated with Hauer on its contents . He introduced twelve-tone music at Darmstadt in 1946  and composed electronic music at the Studio for Electronic Music (WDR) in Cologne in 1956, where his Elektronische Komposition I was performed and broadcast in a concert of the Musik der Zeit series on 30 May 1956. He then founded a studio of his own in Darmstadt .

References

Sources

External links
Hermann Heiss, "Elektronische Komposition I" (1956) by Werner Kaegi (Translation: Desmond Clayton) (archived from 10 October 2009).

German classical composers
20th-century classical composers
Twelve-tone and serial composers
1897 births
1966 deaths
Georg Büchner Prize winners
German male classical composers
20th-century German composers
Musicians from Darmstadt
Place of death missing
20th-century German male musicians
Olympic competitors in art competitions